David Montgomery (born ) is an Irish male road and cyclo-cross cyclist riding for An Post–ChainReaction. He competed in the men's under-23 event at the 2016 UCI Cyclo-cross World Championships  in Heusden-Zolder.

References

External links
 Profile at cyclingarchives.com

1995 births
Living people
Cyclo-cross cyclists
Irish male cyclists
Place of birth missing (living people)